David Agbo (born 1 April 2000) is a Ghanaian footballer who plays as a midfielder for Kristiansund.

Career
In March 2022, he signed a three-year contract with Norwegian side Kristiansund. On 10 April 2022, he made his Eliteserien debut in a 3–2 loss against Sarpsborg 08.

References

External links

2000 births
Living people
Ghanaian footballers
Kristiansund BK players
Eliteserien players
Association football midfielders
Ghanaian expatriate footballers
Expatriate footballers in Norway
Ghanaian expatriate sportspeople in Norway